

History 
When the competition was known as the Victorian Football League (VFL), the league introduced the first incarnation of a draft system in 1981, where teams had two selections each of interstate players determined by reverse finishing position order. This was introduced as an equalisation strategy in response to the increasing transfer fees and player salaries at the time, which in combination with declining attendances, threatened to derail the league. It was also a result of the failure of country zoning, introduced in the late 1960s, which had led to a systematic inequality whereby the clubs with the best zones, like Carlton and Hawthorn, could dominate over clubs with poorer zones like Melbourne.

In 1986, the first VFL draft was held. The draft saw players tied to zones based on their location of residence, with each club having first call on players falling within that zone. The West Coast Eagles received access to all West Australian players, while the Brisbane Bears received six concessionary picks before the other clubs.

Draft rules 
The minimum draft age was 16. Clubs were allowed to select only one WA player each and South Australia was off-limits because of the introduction of Adelaide. Players in Queensland and NSW/ACT could only be selected by clubs other than the Brisbane Bears and Sydney Swans respectively, if the player was older than 19 and not required by the 'local' club. Faced with these restrictions the league reduced the number of choices from eight to six. In exchange for the SA moratorium, the Crows were excluded from the draft (they could pick any South Australian, but only South Australians).

Background 
The talent pool was clearly shallow and most clubs shied away from investing too much hope in the draft. A number of the Victorian clubs, notably Richmond and Fitzroy, couldn't afford to recruit established players so stuck with country footballers and young unproven youngsters. Clubs were believed to be looking to Tasmania as perhaps the only recruiting ground which hadn't been ravaged.
The Under-19's competition was still in operation and clubs had only to list players who had been drafted, and those over the age of 19. Essendon and North Melbourne at this point for example had very talented reserves sides drawn from their metropolitan zones (these zones would later provide the basis for the Northern Knights Under-18 teams).

Pre-draft picks

Pre-draft trades

1991 mid-season draft

1991 national draft

1992 pre-season draft

References

External links 
 The Complete AFL draft
 Official AFL draft page

Australian Football League draft
Afl Draft, 1991